Dainius Kairelis (born 25 September 1979 in Utena) is a Lithuanian professional road bicycle racer.

Major results 

2003
1st, Baby Giro
2005
1st, Stage 2, Herald Sun Tour
2006
 National Road Race Championship
2007
1st, Giro d'Oro

External links
Palmarès by cyclingbase.com  

1979 births
Living people
Lithuanian male cyclists
Cyclists at the 2008 Summer Olympics
Olympic cyclists of Lithuania
Kairelis